The Gataga River is a river in the Northern Rockies of British Columbia, Canada.  It is a tributary of the Kechika River, which is a tributary of the Liard.

References

Rivers of British Columbia
Northern Interior of British Columbia
Rivers of the Canadian Rockies
Cassiar Land District